Luigi Crosio (1835–1915) was an Italian painter who lived and worked in Turin, Italy. He died in Turin and is recorded as having been born in Alba, but the town of Acqui Terme, a few miles south of Alba, claims Crosio was born there.

He attended the Accademia Albertina di Belle Arte in Turin. His immediate work afterwards tilted towards commercial paintings, but thereafter he specialised in genre painting with romantic 18th century scenes and portraits or period characters or Pompeian scenes. He also liked the opera and depicted several scenes from popular operas. He was also listed as a lithographer and was involved in publishing books and images.

He had several daughters and one of them, Carola Crosio, married the famous mathematician Giuseppe Peano (of Peano axioms fame) in 1887.

In 1898 he painted the famous Refugium Peccatorum Madonna (i.e. Refuge of Sinners Madonna) which was later also called Mother Thrice Admirable Madonna, the same year that photographer Secondo Pia took the photo of the Shroud of Turin which later became known as the Holy Face of Jesus.

Sources
 Research on Luigi Crosio
 400 Years "Mother Thrice Admirable", University of Dayton

1835 births
1915 deaths
Painters from Turin
19th-century Italian painters
Italian male painters
20th-century Italian painters
Neo-Pompeian painters
Accademia Albertina alumni
Catholic painters
19th-century Italian male artists
20th-century Italian male artists